Gliese 367 (GJ 367) is a red dwarf star  from Earth in the constellation of Vela. It is suspected to be a variable with amplitude 0.012 stellar magnitude and period 5.16 years. A stellar multiplicity survey in 2015 failed to detect any stellar companions to Gliese 367.

Gliese 367's age is unclear. Modelling using stellar isochrones gives a young age of less than 60 million years old, but its orbit around the Milky Way is highly eccentric, unusual for a young star. It may have been forced into such an orbit via a gravitational encounter.

Planetary system 
The star Gliese 367 was observed by TESS in February-March 2019, leading to its designation as an object of interest, and by January 2021 additional radial velocity data suggested the existence of a short-period planet, albeit with low certainty. The planet's existence was confirmed by both ground-based and satellite-based transit photometry data by December 2021.

Gliese 367 b takes just 7.7 hours to orbit its star, one of the shortest orbits of any planet. Due to its close orbit, the exoplanet gets bombarded with radiation over 500 times what Earth receives from the Sun. Due to its close orbit, it most likely is tidally locked. The atmosphere of Gliese 367 b, due to the extreme temperatures, would have boiled away along with signs of life. The core of GJ 367b is likely composed of iron and nickel, making its core similar to Mercury's core. The core of GJ 367b is extremely dense, making up most of the planet's mass.

, Gliese 367 b is the smallest known exoplanet within 10 parsecs of the Solar System, and the second-least massive after Proxima Centauri d.

In August 2022, this planetary system was included among 20 systems to be named by the third NameExoWorlds project.

A direct imaging study in 2022 failed to find any additional planets or stellar companions around Gliese 367. The possible detection of two additional super-Earth-mass planets with periods of 11.5 and 34 days was announced at an American Astronomical Society conference in 2022, but has yet to be published in a peer-reviewed journal.

See also 
List of nearest exoplanets

References 

M-type main-sequence stars
Planetary systems with one confirmed planet
Planetary transit variables
Vela (constellation)
047780
J09442986-4546351
0367
CD-45 5378
0731